Anthophylax attenuatus is the species of the Lepturinae subfamily in long-horned beetle family. This beetle is distributed in Canada, and USA. Adult beetle feeds on sugar maple, American beech, and on hophornbeam.

References

Further reading

Lepturinae
Beetles described in 1847
Beetles of North America